Rana Muhammad Arshad is a Pakistani politician who was a Member of the Provincial Assembly of the Punjab, from 2008 to May 2018.

Early life and education
He was born on 13 January 1970 in Sheikhupura Pakistan.

He has a degree of Bachelor of Arts  which he obtained in 1990 from University of the Punjab.

Political career
He ran for the seat of the Provincial Assembly of the Punjab as a candidate of Pakistan Muslim League (N) (PML-N) from Constituency PP-171 (Nankana Sahib-II) in 2002 Pakistani general election but was unsuccessful. He received 12,820 votes and lost the seat to Rai Ijaz Ahmed Khan, an independent candidate.

He was elected to the Provincial Assembly of the Punjab as a candidate of PML-N from Constituency PP-171 (Nankana Sahib-II) in by-polls held in June 2008. He received 22,715 votes and defeated Sardar Iftikhar Ahmad Dogar, a candidate of Pakistan Muslim League (Q).

He was re-elected to the Provincial Assembly of the Punjab as a candidate of PML-N from Constituency PP-171 (Nankana Sahib-II) in 2013 Pakistani general election.

In December 2013, he was appointed as Parliamentary Secretary for  information & culture.

References

Living people
Punjab MPAs 2013–2018
1970 births
Pakistan Muslim League (N) politicians
Punjab MPAs 2008–2013